Melaleuca serpentina is a plant in the myrtle family, Myrtaceae and is endemic to the Barraba district in Australia. (Some Australian state herbaria continue to use the name Callistemon serpentinus.) It is a shrub with yellow or creamy-green bottlebrush flowers. It is similar to Melaleuca citrina but can be distinguished from that species by its flower colour (red in M. citrina) and its shorter stamens.

Description
The leaves have a mid-vein but the lateral veins are obscure and there are many distinct oil glands.

The flowers are creamy green to yellow and are arranged in spikes on the ends of branches that continue to grow after flowering and also in the leaf axils.

Taxonomy and naming
Melaleuca serpentina was first formally described in 2009 by Lyndley Craven in Novon from a specimen collected adjacent to the Woodsreef asbestos mine near Barraba. In 2012, Udovicic and Spencer gave the species the name Callistemon serpentinus, but in 2013, Craven transferred all species previously known as Callistemon to Melaleuca. Some authorities continue to use Callistemon serpentinus. The specific epithet (serpentina) refers to this species often occurring on soils derived from serpentinite.

Callistemon serpentinus is regarded as a synonym of Melaleuca serpentina by the Royal Botanic Gardens, Kew.

Distribution and habitat
Melaleuca serpentina occurs in the Barraba district growing in grassy woodland on soils derived from serpentinite.

References

serpentina
Flora of New South Wales
Plants described in 2009
Taxa named by Lyndley Craven